Musey may be,

Musey language
Poney Musey, a breed of horse
George Musey